The 2022/23 FIS Nordic Combined Continental Cup is the 39th Continental Cup season, organized by the International Ski Federation. It will start on 17 December 2022 in Ruka, Finland, and will conclude on 26 March 2023 in Oberwiesenthal, Germany.

On 1 March 2022, following the 2022 Russian invasion of Ukraine, FIS decided to exclude athletes from Russia and Belarus from FIS competitions, with an immediate effect.

Calendar

Men

Women

Mixed

Standings

Men's Overall

Women's Overall

References 

2022 in Nordic combined
2023 in Nordic combined
FIS Nordic Combined World Cup
Nordic combined